Jonathan Frankel (Yonatan Frankel) is a self-described entrepreneur, and co-founder/CEO of Nucleus.

Early life
Frankel, a graduate of DRS HALB (Davis Renov Stahler Yeshiva High School for Boys), obtained rabbinical ordination, a Baccalaureate in Computer Science from Yeshiva University, and then continued his education at Harvard Law School(JD).

Career
After Harvard he worked at Boston Consulting Group.

Nucleus 
His 2013 Nucleus backers included former NFL quarterback Joe Montana, Founders Fund's billionaire Peter Thiel,
and LinkedIn co-founder Reid Hoffman. CNET described their product as "a touchscreen-enabled intercom system." Frankel's followup NucleusCare offering focuses on the intercom and site-to-site needs of home-care agencies and senior-care facilities. His 2016 round of funding, $5.6 million, was led by Amazon.

References

American inventors
Harvard Law School alumni
Yeshiva University alumni
Living people
Year of birth missing (living people)